Perry Hall (April 18, 1898 – February 3, 1993) was an American Negro league infielder between 1921 and 1943.

A native of Hogansville, Georgia, Hall made his Negro leagues debut in 1921 for the St. Louis Giants and Detroit Stars. He went on to play with several teams, including the Birmingham Black Barons and Bacharach Giants, and finished his career in 1943 with a brief stint with the Cincinnati Clowns. Hall died in Chicago, Illinois in 1993 at age 94.

References

External links
 and Baseball-Reference Black Baseball stats and Seamheads

1898 births
1993 deaths
Bacharach Giants players
Birmingham Black Barons players
Cincinnati Clowns players
Cleveland Tigers (baseball) players
Detroit Stars players
Indianapolis Athletics players
Memphis Red Sox players
Milwaukee Bears players
St. Louis Giants players
St. Louis Stars (baseball) players
20th-century African-American sportspeople
Baseball infielders